Lee Dong-Won (born November 7, 1983) is a South Korean football player who plays for Sriwijaya.

References

External links 
 

1983 births
Living people
South Korean footballers
South Korean expatriate footballers
Jeonnam Dragons players
Incheon United FC players
Daejeon Hana Citizen FC players
Ulsan Hyundai FC players
Busan IPark players
K League 1 players
Lee Dong-won
Lee Dong-won
Sriwijaya F.C. players
Liga 1 (Indonesia) players
Expatriate footballers in Thailand
South Korean expatriate sportspeople in Thailand
Expatriate footballers in Indonesia
South Korean expatriate sportspeople in Indonesia
Soongsil University alumni
Association football defenders